Kelvin is a masculine given name, ultimately derived from the title of William Thomson, 1st Baron Kelvin, who received a baronage named for the River Kelvin (the river flowing past the University of Glasgow) in 1892.
Isolated use of "Kelvin" as a given name is recorded in England in the 1920s, and the name rises in popularity in the United States around 1950, according to the authors of  the Oxford Dictionary of First Names possibly by association with the similar-sounding Kevin, which surged in popularity at about the same time, and maybe further influenced by Calvin and Melvin.  In the United States the name peaked in popularity at rank 209 in 1961 and has declined steadily since, dropping to rank 726 as of 2016.

People with the given name

In arts and entertainment
Kelvin Fletcher, English actor
Kelvin Gosnell, British comics editor
Kelvin Harrison Jr., American actor
Kelvin Holly, American guitarist
Kelvin Mercer, American DJ
Kelvin Sng, Singaporean film director
Kelvin Tan Wei Lian, Singaporean singer

In politics
Kelvin Davis, New Zealand Member of Parliament
Kelvin Goertzen, Canadian politician
Kelvin Hopkins, British Labour MP
Kelvin Ogilvie, Canadian chemist and senator
Kelvin Thomson, Australian politician

In sports

Football (soccer)
Kelvin Clarke, English former footballer
Kelvin Davis, English footballer
Kelvin Etuhu, Nigerian footballer
Kelvin Jack, Trinidadian footballer
Kelvin Langmead, English footballer
Kelvin Lomax, English footballer
Kelvin Mateus de Oliveira, Brazilian footballer
Kelvin Wilson, English footballer

American football
Kelvin Anderson, retired American football player
Kelvin Benjamin, American football player
Kelvin Bryant, American football player
Kelvin Harmon, American football player
Kelvin Hayden, American football player
Kelvin Joseph (born 1999), American football player
Kelvin Kinney, American football player
Kelvin Kirk, American football player
Kelvin Korver, American football player
Kelvin Smith, American football player

Australian rules football
Kelvin Matthews, former Australian rules footballer
Kelvin Moore, former Australian rules footballer
Kelvin W. Moore, former Australian rules footballer
Kelvin Templeton, former Australian rules footballer

Basketball
Kelvin Cato, American basketball player
Kelvin dela Peña, Filipino-Canadian basketball player
Kelvin Ransey, American basketball player
Kelvin Sampson, American basketball coach
Kelvin Scarborough, American basketball player
Kelvin Upshaw, American basketball player

Other sports
Kelvin Batey, English competitive BMW racer
Kelvin Burt, British auto racing driver
Kelvin Davis, American boxer
Kelvin Gastelum, American mixed martial artist
Kelvin Jiménez, Dominican baseball player

In other fields
Kelvin Droegemeier, American meteorologist and government advisor
Kelvin Holdsworth, Scottish clergyman
Kelvin Kent (disambiguation), multiple people
Kelvin Lancaster, American academic
Kelvin MacKenzie, British media executive
Kelvin Malone, American spree killer
Kelvin Martin, American criminal
Kelvin Ogilvie, Canadian chemist and senator
Kelvin Alvarado, Salvadorian American computer engineer

Fictional characters
Kelvin Carpenter, fictional character in the television show EastEnders
Kelvin Joe Inman, secondary character on the ABC television drama Lost

References

Scottish masculine given names
English masculine given names